Sarah Leonard may refer to:
 Sarah Leonard (archer)
 Sarah Leonard (singer)